Genetic Epidemiology is a peer-reviewed medical journal for research on the genetic epidemiology of human traits in families and populations. It is published by John Wiley & Sons on behalf of the International Genetic Epidemiology Society.

According to the Journal Citation Reports, the journal has a 2020 impact factor of 2.135.

References

External links 
 
 International Genetic Epidemiology Society

Epidemiology journals
Medical genetics journals
Wiley (publisher) academic journals
Publications established in 1984
English-language journals
Academic journals associated with learned and professional societies
Genetic epidemiology